Arsenidosilicates are chemical compounds that contain anions with arsenic bonded to silicon. They are in the category of tetrelarsenides, pnictidosilicates, or tetrelpnictides. They can be classed as Zintl phases or intermetallics. They are analogous to the nitridosilicates, phosphidosilicates, arsenidogermanates, and arsenidostannates. They are distinct from arsenate silicates which have oxygen connected with arsenic and silicon, or arsenatosilicates with arsenate groups sharing oxygen with silicate.

Arsenidosilicates have dark coloured crystals, usually metallic black. They are often decomposed by water, and some are unstable with respect to the water in air.

These compounds have been investigated as ionic conductors, semiconductors and photovoltaics.

List

References 

Arsenic compounds
Silicon compounds